France Lassie Mabiletsa (born 25 November 1962), known as France Mabiletsa, is an Olympic light heavyweight boxer from Botswana. He won a bronze medal at the 1994 Commonwealth Games and competed at the 1992 Summer Olympics.

References

External links
 

1962 births
Living people
Botswana male boxers
Light-heavyweight boxers
Olympic boxers of Botswana
Boxers at the 1992 Summer Olympics
Commonwealth Games bronze medallists for Botswana
Commonwealth Games medallists in boxing
Boxers at the 1994 Commonwealth Games
Medallists at the 1994 Commonwealth Games